The 2007 Berlin Marathon was the 34th edition of the Berlin Marathon. The marathon took place in Berlin, Germany, on 30 September 2007 and was the fourth World Marathon Majors race of the year.

The men's race was won by Haile Gebrselassie in 2:04:26 hours and the women's race was won by Gete Wami in a time of 2:23:17 hours.

Results

Men

Women

References

External links

34st BMW Berlin Marathon

Berlin Marathon
Berlin Marathon
2007 in Berlin
Berlin Marathon